Addicted to War: Why The US Can't Kick Militarism, is a 77 letter-sized page "illustrated exposé" by Joel Andreas published by Frank Dorrel with AK Press in 2002. Originally published in 1991, the book was out of print until Dorrel convinced Andreas to create an updated, post-9/11 version.

The book tells the history of U.S. foreign wars — from the Indian Wars to the wars in Iraq and Afghanistan — in a comic book format. Including 161 reference notes, the book aims to demonstrate why the U.S. has been involved in more wars in recent years than any other country, and to explain who benefits from these military adventures, who pays and who dies.

Translations
The first foreign-language edition was that of Japanese, in October 2002, by political activist Yumi Kikuchi. Andreas had not thought that his book would resonate with a foreign audience.

Notes

External links 
Addicted to War homepage

1991 non-fiction books
1991 graphic novels
2004 non-fiction books
2004 graphic novels
Andreas, Joel
Books about foreign relations of the United States
Books about the United States military
Non-fiction books about war
American non-fiction books
Non-fiction graphic novels
AK Press books